Lubnica is a village in the municipality of Konče, North Macedonia.

Demographics
According to the 2002 census, the village had a total of 361 inhabitants. Ethnic groups in the village include:

Macedonians 359
Serbs 1
Others 1

References

Villages in Konče Municipality